A villa miseria, or just villa, is the informal term for a type of shanty town slum found in Argentina, mostly around the largest urban settlements.

Name
The term is a noun phrase made up of the Spanish words villa (village, small town) and miseria (misery, destitution), and was adopted from Bernardo Verbitsky's 1957 novel Villa Miseria también es América ("Villa Miseria is also [a part of] the Americas").

These shanty towns are euphemistically called asentamientos ("settlements") or villas de emergencia ("emergency villages"). In most parts of Argentina, the non-modified word villa usually refers to a villa miseria.

Informal settlements
These settlements consist of small houses or shacks made of tin, wood and other scrap material. The alleys are not usually paved, and narrow internal passages connect the different parts. The villas miseria have no sewerage. There may be water pipes passing through the settlement. Electric power is sometimes taken directly from the grid using illegal connections, which are  accepted by suppliers.

The villas range from small groups of precarious houses to larger, more organized communities with thousands of residents. In rural areas, the houses in the villas miseria might be made of mud and wood. There are villas miseria around and within  most cities of the country. The villas draw people from several backgrounds, often local people who have fallen from an already precarious economic position. In most cases, a villa miseria is populated by the children and grandchildren of the original settlers, who have been unable to improve their situation.

Statistics

In July 2004 it was estimated that there were about 640 "precarious neighborhoods" in suburban Buenos Aires, with 690,000 residents and 111,000 households. The population of the villas miseria in the city of Buenos Aires doubled during the 1990s, reaching about 120,000 as of 2005.

By 2011, there were over 500,000 people living in more than 800 informal settlements around the periphery of Buenos Aires. Research from an NGO called 'A roof for my country' (UTPMP) found that of these settlements, 66% had been founded in the last fifteen years and 65% were still growing. Most villa (85%) had no sewage facilities, and a similar percentage had no access to gas.

The Government's statistics agency (INDEC) announced in 2016 that 8.8 million people, 32.2% of the population, were living in poverty. This was a dramatic leap in numbers from the 4.7%  people living in poverty just three years before.

The non-profit TECHO estimated there more than 1,000 informal settlements in greater Buenos Aires in 2015. It stated that only 10% of villas had access to running water and 5% to sewage infrastructure.

Programs
Attempting to address the housing problem, de facto President Alejandro Lanusse established the National Housing Fund (FONAVI) in 1972. An amalgam of long-standing national housing programs and lending facilities previously managed by the National Mortgage Bank, the FONAVI helped coordinate slum clearance efforts and, since then, has put up over 25,000 housing units a year (both single-family and multi-family types).

Granting deeds on a lease-to-own basis, the fund mostly provides for households in Argentina's lowest income bracket and, thus, has historically had a collection rate of less than five per cent. The fund, one of the most important, is largely underwritten by national fuel and other excise taxes.

The military junta which ruled Argentina between 1974 and 1983 in the Dirty War attempted to destroy the informal slums by forcibly resettling people, which only succeeded in moving the villas miseria to new locations.

More recently, Mayor of Buenos Aires Horacio Rodriguez Larreta said that he intended to regularize all the informal settlements by 2023.

Villa 1-11-14
Villa 1-11-14 is an informal settlement in the Flores area of Buenos Aires of about 70,000 people. The average age is 24 years, compared to 40 elsewhere in the city. Some streets are controlled by drug-dealing gangs.

Villa 31

Villa 31 is a large villa miseria in the Retiro, Buenos Aires area of Buenos Aires, near the local railway station.

It dates from the 1930s and in 2017 had around 40,000 inhabitants. The city council planned to renovate the area by 2020, by improving housing, offering the opportunity for people to become home owners and connecting electricity, water and sewage facilities. The $320 million plan, financed by the World Bank and the Inter-American Development Bank, aimed to resettle squatters into 1,350 new homes. At least 30% of the residents were concerned that they would not be rehoused.

In culture

Mundo Villa is a TV station, a radio channel (Mundo Sur), a magazine issued monthly and a website focusing specifically on villas.

Inspired by Mundo Villa, another new magazine La Garganta Poderosa ('The Mighty Throat') was set up in 2011.

Argentinian painter Antonio Berni dealt with the hardships of living in a villa miseria through his series Juanito Laguna, a slum child, and Ramona Montiel, a prostitute.

César Aira published his novel La Villa in 2001 (released in English translation in 2013 as Shantytown). In it he examines the invisibility of slumdwellers.

The Argentinian writer Hugo Pezzini comments on the book: "The apparent absurdity of César Aira's novel La Villa provides an instance of resourceful mediation to semantically reorganize a situation of emergency and locate it within its particular rationale. In Argentina, a slum is popularly called 'villa miseria,' or simply 'la villa.' In politically correct language, that is, officially, is called 'villa de emergencia.'"

The adjective villera refers to these shantytowns, notably in the name of the popular music style cumbia villera.

See also

 Squatting in Argentina
 Favela (Brazil)
 Pueblos jóvenes (Peru)

References

External links
  El derecho a la vivienda en Argentina, Informe misión de investigación, Centre of Housing Rights and Evictions, 2004.

Society of Argentina
Shanty towns in South America
Human habitats
Slums in South America
Squatting in Argentina